This is the complete list of Asian Games medalists in bodybuilding from 2002 to 2006.

Men

Flyweight
 60 kg: 2002–2006

Bantamweight
 65 kg: 2002–2006

Lightweight
 70 kg: 2002–2006

Welterweight
 75 kg: 2002–2006

Light middleweight
 80 kg: 2002–2006

Middleweight
 85 kg: 2002–2006

Light heavyweight
 90 kg: 2002–2006

Heavyweight
 +90 kg: 2002–2006

References
ABBF Results
2002 Asian Games Official Report, Pages 296–299
2006 Results

Bodybuilding
medalists